NCSA may refer to:

 National Cadet Special Activities, aviation programs run by the American Civil Air Patrol 
 National Center for Supercomputing Applications, a computer science research center in Urbana, IL
 NCSA Common log format, a file format for log files produced by web server software
 NCSA HTTPd, a web server that introduced the Common Gateway Interface
 NCSA Mosaic, an early web browser instrumental to the popularization of the World Wide Web
 NCSA Telnet, a software implementation of the Telnet protocol
 University of Illinois/NCSA Open Source License, a free software license
 National Center for Supercomputing Applications (Bulgaria), a computer science research center in Sofia, Bulgaria
 National Child Search Assistance Act, a United States federal law enacted in 1990
 National Cyber Security Authority (Israel), a government organization merged into the Israeli National Cyber Directorate
 NATO Communications and Information Systems Services Agency, a deactivated agency, formerly within NATO
 Next College Student Athlete, a company facilitating collegiate athletic recruiting
 North Central Sociological Association, a regional American professional organization

See also
 University of North Carolina School of the Arts (UNCSA)
 National Cybersecurity Alliance (NCA)